Pope Eugene IV (1383 – 23 February 1447), born Gabriele Condulmer, was head of the Catholic Church and ruler of the Papal States from 11 March 1431 to his death in February 1447. Condulmer was a Venetian, and a nephew of Pope Gregory XII. In 1431, he was elected pope. His tenure was marked by conflict first with the Colonna, relatives of his predecessor Martin V, and later with the Conciliar movement. In 1434, due to a complaint by Fernando Calvetos, bishop of the Canary Islands, Eugene IV issued the bull "Creator Omnium", rescinding any recognition of Portugal's right to conquer those islands, still pagan. He excommunicated anyone who enslaved newly converted Christians, the penalty to stand until the captives were restored to their liberty and possessions. In 1443 Eugene decided to take a neutral position on territorial disputes between Portugal and Castile regarding rights claimed along the coast of Africa. He also issued "Dundum ad nostram audientiam", which was the legal basis for the creation of Jewish ghettos in Europe.

He is the last pope to date to take on the pontifical name "Eugene".

Early life
Condulmer was born in Venice to a rich merchant family. He entered a community of Canons Regular of San Giorgio in Alga in his native city. At the age of twenty-four he was appointed by his maternal uncle, Pope Gregory XII, as Bishop of Siena. In Siena, the political leaders objected to a bishop who was not only young but also a foreigner. Therefore, he resigned the appointment, becoming instead his uncle's papal treasurer, protonotary and Cardinal Priest of the Basilica of San Clemente.

Pope Martin V named him Cardinal Priest of the Basilica di Santa Maria in Trastevere. He also served as papal legate at Picenum in the March of Ancona.

Papacy
Condulmer was quickly elected to succeed Martin V in the papal conclave of 1431. He was crowned as Eugene IV at St. Peter's Basilica on 11 March 1431. By a written agreement made before his election he pledged to distribute to the cardinals one-half of all the revenues of the Church and promised to consult with them on all questions of importance, both spiritual and temporal. He is described as tall, thin, with a winning countenance, although many of his troubles were owing to his own want of tact, which alienated parties from him. Upon assuming the papal chair, Eugene IV took violent measures against the numerous Colonna relatives of his predecessor Martin V, who had rewarded them with castles and lands. This at once involved him in a serious contest with the powerful house of Colonna that nominally supported the local rights of Rome against the interests of the Papacy. A truce was soon arranged.

Conciliar reform and papal misfortunes

By far the most important feature of Eugene IV's pontificate was the great struggle between the Pope and the Council of Basel (1431–39), the final embodiment of the Conciliar movement. On 23 July 1431, his legate Giuliano Cesarini opened the council, which had been convoked by Martin V. Canon Beaupère of Besançon, who had been sent from Basel to Rome, gave the pope an unfavourable and exaggerated account of the temper of the people of Basel and its environs. Distrustful of its purposes and emboldened by the small attendance, the Pope issued a bull on 18 December 1431 that dissolved the council and called a new one to meet in eighteen months at Bologna. The council resisted this expression of papal prerogative. Eugene IV's action gave some weight to the contention that the Curia was opposed to any authentic measures of reform. The council refused to dissolve; instead they renewed the resolutions by which the Council of Constance had declared a council superior to the Pope and ordered Eugene IV to appear at Basel. A compromise was arranged by the Holy Roman Emperor Sigismund, who had been crowned emperor at Rome on 31 May 1433. By its terms, the Pope recalled his bull of dissolution, and, reserving all the rights of the Holy See, acknowledged the council as ecumenical on 15 December 1433 except for the initial unapproved sessions that contained canons which exalted conciliar authority above that of the pope.

These concessions also were due to the invasion of the Papal States by the former Papal condottiero Niccolò Fortebraccio and the troops of Filippo Maria Visconti led by Niccolò Piccinino in retaliation for Eugene's support of Florence and Venice against Milan (see also Wars in Lombardy). This situation led also to establishment of an insurrectionary republic at Rome controlled by the Colonna family. In early June 1434, disguised in the robes of a Benedictine monk, Eugene was rowed down the center of the Tiber, pelted by stones from either bank, to a Florentine vessel waiting to pick him up at Ostia. The city was restored to obedience by Giovanni Vitelleschi, the militant Bishop of Recanati, in the following October. In August 1435 a peace treaty was signed at Ferrara by the various belligerents. The Pope moved to Bologna in April 1436. His condottieri Francesco I Sforza and Vitelleschi in the meantime reconquered much of the Papal States. Traditional Papal enemies such as the Prefetti di Vico were destroyed, while the Colonna were reduced to obedience after the destruction of their stronghold in Palestrina in August 1436.

Resurgence
Meanwhile, the struggle with the council sitting at Basel broke out anew. Eugene IV at length convened a rival council at Ferrara on 8 January 1438 and excommunicated the prelates assembled at Basel. King Charles VII of France had forbidden members of the clergy in his kingdom from attending the counsel in Ferrara, and introduced the decrees of the Council of Basel, with slight changes, into France through the Pragmatic Sanction of Bourges (7 July 1438). The King of England and the Duke of Burgundy, who felt that the council was partial to France, decided not to recognize the council at Basel. Castile, Aragon, Milan, and Bavaria withdrew support.

The Council of Basel suspended Eugene on 24 January 1438, then formally deposed him as a heretic on 25 June 1439. In the following November the council elected the ambitious Amadeus VIII, Duke of Savoy, as antipope under the name of Felix V. The Diet of Mainz had deprived the Pope of most of his rights in the Empire (26 March 1439).

At Florence, where the council of Ferrara had been transferred as a result of an outbreak of the plague, a union with the Eastern Orthodox Church was effected in July 1439, which, as the result of political necessities, proved but a temporary bolster to the papacy's prestige. This union was followed by others of even less stability. Eugene IV signed an agreement with the Armenians on 22 November 1439, and with a part of the Jacobites of Syria in 1443, and in 1445 he received some of the Nestorians and the Maronites. He did his best to stem the Turkish advance, pledging one-fifth of the papal income to a crusade which set out in 1443, but which met with overwhelming defeat at the Battle of Varna. Cardinal Cesarini, the papal legate, perished in the rout.

Eugene's rival Felix V in the meantime obtained scant recognition, even in the Empire. Eventually Holy Roman Emperor Frederick III moved toward acceptance of Eugene. One of the king's ablest advisers, the humanist Aeneas Sylvius Piccolomini, who was later to be Pope Pius II, made peace with Eugene in 1442. The Pope's recognition of the claim to Naples of King Alfonso V of Aragon (in the treaty of Terracina, approved by Eugene at Siena somewhat later) withdrew the last important support in Italy from the Council of Basel. In 1442 Eugene, Alfonso and Visconti sent Niccolò Piccinino to reconquer the March of Ancona from Francesco Sforza; but the defeat of the allied army at the Battle of Montolmo pushed the Pope to reconcile with Sforza.

So enabled, Eugene IV made a victorious entry into Rome on 28 September 1443 after an exile of nearly ten years.

His protests against the Pragmatic Sanction of Bourges were ineffectual, but by means of the Concordat of the Princes, negotiated by Piccolomini with the electors in February 1447, the whole of Germany declared against the antipope. This agreement was completed only after Eugene's death.

Slavery

Christianity had gained many converts in the Canary Islands by the early 1430s. However, the ownership of the lands had been the subject of dispute between Portugal and the Kingdom of Castille. The lack of effective control had resulted in periodic raids on the islands to procure slaves. As early as the Council of Koblenz in 922, the capture of Christians as slaves by other Christians had been condemned.

Acting on a complaint by Fernando Calvetos, bishop of the islands, Pope Eugene IV issued a Papal bull, "Creator Omnium", on 17 December 1434, annulling previous permission granted to Portugal to conquer those islands still pagan. Eugene excommunicated anyone who enslaved newly converted Christians, the penalty to stand until the captives were restored to their liberty and possessions. In 1434, Eugene issued Regimini Gregis Dominici forbidding the enslavement of Christian Canarians, and followed this with an order to suspend further conquest in order to allow the Franciscans to continue their work peacefully.

Portuguese soldiers continued to raid the islands in 1435, and Eugene issued a further edict Sicut Dudum that prohibited wars being waged against the islands and affirming the ban on enslavement. Eugene condemned the enslavement of the peoples of the newly colonized Canary Islands and, under pain of excommunication, ordered all such slaves to be immediately set free.
Eugene went on to say that, "If this is not done when the fifteen days have passed, they incur the sentence of excommunication by the act itself, from which they cannot be absolved, except at the point of death, even by the Holy See, or by any Spanish bishop, or by the aforementioned Ferdinand, unless they have first given freedom to these captive persons and restored their goods." The specific reference to Spanish bishops and Bishop Ferdinand of San Marcial del Rubicón in Lanzarote suggests that the Portuguese were not the only ones engaged in slave raids in the Canaries.

Eugene tempered Sicut Dudum in September 1436 with the issuance of a papal bull in response to complaints made by King Edward of Portugal that allowed the Portuguese to conquer any unconverted parts of the Canary Islands. According to Raiswell (1997), any Christian would be protected by the earlier edict but the un-baptized were implicitly allowed to be enslaved.

Following the arrival of the first African captives in Lisbon in 1441, Prince Henry asked Eugene to designate Portugal's raids along the West African coast as a crusade, a consequence of which would be the legitimization of enslavement for captives taken during the crusade. On 19 December 1442, Eugene replied by issuing the bull Illius qui se pro divini, in which he granted full remission of sins to those who took part in any expeditions against the Saracens. In 1443, in the bull Rex regum, the Pope took a neutral position on territorial disputes between Portugal and Castile regarding rights claimed in Africa.

Richard Raiswell interprets the bulls of Eugene as helping in some way the development of thought which perceived the enslavement of Africans by the Portuguese and later Europeans "as dealing a blow for Christendom". Joel S Panzer views Sicut Dudum as a significant condemnation of slavery, issued sixty years before the Europeans found the New World.

Death and legacy

Although his pontificate had been so stormy and unhappy that he is said to have regretted on his deathbed that he ever left his monastery, Eugene IV's victory over the Council of Basel and his efforts on behalf of church unity nevertheless contributed greatly to the breakdown of the conciliar movement and restored the papacy to a semblance of the dominant position it had held before the Western Schism (1378–1417). This victory had been gained, however, by making concessions to the princes of Europe. Thereafter, the papacy had to depend more for its revenues on the Papal States.

Eugene was dignified in demeanour, but inexperienced and vacillating in action and excitable in temper. Bitter in his hatred of heresy, he nevertheless displayed great kindness to the poor. He laboured to reform the monastic orders, especially the Franciscans, and was never guilty of nepotism. Although austere in his private life, he was a sincere friend of art and learning, and in 1431 he re-established the university at Rome. He also consecrated Florence Cathedral on 25 March 1436.

Eugene died in Rome on 23 February 1447 and was buried at Saint Peter's by the tomb of Pope Eugene III. Later his tomb was transferred to San Salvatore in Lauro, a parish church on the other bank of the Tiber River.

Fictional depictions
Eugene is portrayed by David Bamber in the 2016 television series Medici: Masters of Florence.

See also

List of popes

Notes

References
 Dulles, S.J., Avery. "Development or Reversal?", First Things Magazine, October 2005
 Maxwell, John Francis. Slavery and the Catholic Church, Barry Rose Publishers, 1975 
 Panzer, Joel S. "The Popes and Slavery", The Church In History Centre, 22 April 2008

 The Historical Encyclopedia of World Slavery, Contributor Richard Raiswell, Editor Junius P. Rodriguez, ABC-CLIO, 1997, 
 Christopher Columbus and the enslavement of the Amerindians in the Caribbean. (Columbus and the New World Order 1492–1992)., Sued-Badillo, Jalil, Monthly Review. Monthly Review Foundation, Inc. 1992. HighBeam Research. 10 August 2009
A Violent Evangelism, Luis N. Rivera, Luis Rivera Pagán, Westminster John Knox Press, 1992, 
The African Slave Trade, Basil Davidson, James Currey Publishers, 1961, 
A Successful Defeat. Eugenius IV's Struggle with the Council of Basel for Ultimate Authority in the Church, 1431/1449, M. Decaluwe, Brepols Publishers, 2010, 
 Joseph Gill, Eugenius IV, Pope of Christian Union (Westminster, Md., Newman Press, 1961).

External links
Curp, T. David. "A Necessary Bondage? When the Church Endorsed Slavery", Crisis Vol. 23, No. 8 (September 2005)

 
1383 births
1447 deaths
15th-century Venetian people
Eugenius 4, Pope
Cardinal-nephews
Renaissance Papacy
Christians of the Crusade of Varna
Correr family
15th-century popes
Popes from Venice